Head On is a 1998 Australian LGBT-related romantic drama film directed by Ana Kokkinos, who wrote the screenplay with Andrew Bovell and Mira Robertson. The film is based on the 1995 novel Loaded, and written by Christos Tsiolkas. The film stars Alex Dimitriades, Paul Capsis, Julian Garner and Tony Nikolakopoulos. The film tells the story of Ari, a 19-year-old homosexual Greek-Australian living in St. Kilda, Melbourne. The film gained notoriety upon its release for its sexual explicitness, including a graphic masturbation scene performed by Dimitriades and numerous sex scenes. The film received mixed reviews from critics, with positive reviewers praising its stark realism, the lead performance by Dimitriades and the uncompromising subject matter.

Plot 
Over a 24-hour period, 19-year-old Ari confronts his sexuality and his Greek background. Ari is obsessed with sex and has sexual encounters with multiple people, most of them gay, and attempts to fulfill the sister of one of his best friends. At the same time, he is facing problems with his traditional Greek parents, who have no clue about his sexual and drug taking activities.

Cast 
 Alex Dimitriades as Ari  
 Paul Capsis as Johnny/Tula  
 Julian Garner as Sean  
 Tony Nikolakopoulos as Dimitri  
 Elena Mandalis as Betty  
 Damien Fotiou as Joe  
 Eugenia Fragos as Sophia  
 María Mercedes as Tasia  
 Alex Papps as Peter
 Dora Kaskanis as Dina   
 Vassili Zappa as Vassili  
 Andrea Mandalis as Alex

Reception 
On Rotten Tomatoes the film has an approval rating of 63% based on reviews from 24 critics.

Head On divided the Greek community in Australia, Kokkinos said in an interview with the Los Angeles Times. Kokkinos said "what it did is that it opened up a dialogue between younger Greeks and their parents. What the film has done is that it has broken down barriers."

Accolades 
Australian Film Institute
 Best Actor (Alex Dimitriades, nominated)
 Best Costume Design (nominated)
 Best Direction (Ana Kokkinos, nominated)
 Best Editing (won)
 Best Film (nominated)
 Best Original Score (Ollie Olsen, nominated) 
 Best Screenplay - Adapted (Andrew Bovell, Ana Kokkinos and Mira Robertson, nominated)
 Best Sound (nominated)
 Best Supporting Actor (Paul Capsis, nominated)

L.A. Outfest
 Grand Jury Award: Outstanding Foreign Narrative Feature (Ana Kokkinos, won)

San Francisco International Lesbian & Gay Film Festival
 Best First Feature (Ana Kokkinos, won)

References

External links 
 
 
 
 Head On at Oz Movies
 
 Head On at the National Film and Sound Archive
 "Surprising Results at Awards" by Joshua Smith.

1998 films
1998 LGBT-related films
1998 romantic drama films
1990s coming-of-age drama films
1990s teen drama films
1990s teen romance films
Australian LGBT-related films
Australian romantic drama films
Australian teen drama films
Coming-of-age romance films
Films about death
Films about drugs
Films about friendship
Films about race and ethnicity
Films about racism
Films based on Australian novels
Films shot in Melbourne
Films produced by Jane Scott
Gay-related films
1990s Greek-language films
Lesbian-related films
LGBT-related coming-of-age films
LGBT-related romantic drama films
Teen LGBT-related films
Transgender-related films
1990s Australian films